Ashtabula High School was a public high school that served the city of Ashtabula, Ohio from the mid-1800s until it was closed in 2001 in order to merge with nearby Harbor High School under the name of Lakeside High School.  The building then housed 10th-12th grades until the new Lakeside was completed in 2006.  The latest edition of AHS (built in 1916) was demolished in 2012.

References

High schools in Ashtabula County, Ohio
Ashtabula, Ohio
Defunct schools in Ohio
Buildings and structures demolished in 2012
Demolished buildings and structures in Ohio